The Australian Political Studies Association (APSA) is a professional association for teachers and researchers of political science in Australia or New Zealand. It publishes the Australian Journal of Political Science (AJPS) and host a regular Annual Conference.

References

External links
 Australian Political Studies Association
 Australian Journal of Political Science

Political science organizations